Hakoah All-Stars is a former United States soccer club, based in New York City, that played in the American Soccer League between 1930 and 1932. The club was formed after the merger of Brooklyn Hakoah of the ASL and New York Hakoah of the Eastern Soccer League. Both of these clubs were formed by former players from SC Hakoah Wien. Béla Guttmann played for the team.

Year-by-year

References

 
Jewish football clubs
Men's soccer clubs in New York (state)
Defunct soccer clubs in New York City
All-Stars
Jewish organizations based in New York City
American Soccer League (1921–1933) teams